Ravda a coastal village and seaside resort in  southeastern Bulgaria, situated in Nesebar municipality, Burgas Province. Ravda is a small seaside resort on the Black Sea, located 3 km from Nesebar and 5 km from Sunny Beach. 30 km from Bourgas airport. After 1924, Bulgarian refugees from the villages of Koufalia, Bozets, Kirkalovo, Mikro Monastiri, Barovitsa, Ramel, Krya Vrysi, Kadinovo and Axos in Aegean Macedonia settled in Ravda.
 
The position on the Bulgarian Black Sea Coast provides for the nice weather, quietness and calmness of a country village and the proximity to the attractive resorts Nesebar (world heritage site) and Sunny Beach offers plenty of attractions and entertainment possibilities. Ravda has ecologically clean air and water because the resort is far from the big cities and industrial zones. There are no dangerous species such as sharks, poisonous jelly-fish, scorpions, killer snakes, venomous spiders, or flies.

The average monthly temperature during the summer is 22°C (71°F). Ravda's beaches have fine sand, sunshades are provided for the tourists and there are qualified lifeguards on duty. The cafes and bars near the seaside offer refreshing drinks. There are several big hotels in Ravda and many private rooms and small family hotels, as well as a great number of restaurants, taverns, and disco clubs.

There are regular bus lines to the other resorts in the area — every 30 minutes to Burgas and every 20 minutes to Sunny Beach and Nesebar. Ravda's postal code is 8238, the telephone area code is +(359) 554, where (359) is the country code.  the village has a population of 1,745.

Honour
Ravda Peak on Livingston Island in the South Shetland Islands, Antarctica is named after Ravda.

References

External links
 - Hotel Krasi
 Ravda - Hotel Aura
 Article about Ravda

Seaside resorts in Bulgaria
Villages in Burgas Province
Populated coastal places in Bulgaria